Villers-sous-Foucarmont is a commune in the Seine-Maritime department in the Normandy region in northern France.

Geography

Population

Places of interest
 The church of St. Vincent, dating from the sixteenth century.
 The château de La Quesnoy, dating from the sixteenth century, with its chapel.

See also
Communes of the Seine-Maritime department

References

Communes of Seine-Maritime